Andreas Lagonikakis (born 4 June 1972) is a former Greek football player.

Panathinaikos 
In 1994, he joined Panathinaikos from Panionios. There, he managed to participate in the European Champions' League where Panathinaikos managed to reach the semi finals in the 1995–96 season. During his time in this club, he has played in a total of 11 champions' League games and he has scored 1 goal in this tournament.
Being able to play in many positions, he was used by his coaches as a central midfielder, a wide midfielder, an attacking midfielder/trequartista, a winger on the left, a support striker, and even as a left wing-back on rare occasions.

References

External links
Profile at Rapidarchiv.at

Profile at insports.gr

1972 births
Living people
Greek expatriate footballers
Panionios F.C. players
Panathinaikos F.C. players
SK Rapid Wien players
AEK F.C. non-playing staff
Association football midfielders
Footballers from Athens
Greek footballers